17th CFCA Awards 
2005

Best Film: 
 Sideways 
The 17th Chicago Film Critics Association Awards, presented in 2005, honored the best in film for 2004.

Winners

Best Actor
Paul Giamatti - Sideways

Best Actress
Imelda Staunton - Vera Drake
 Hilary Swank – Million Dollar Baby
 Kate Winslet – Eternal Sunshine of the Spotless Mind
 Catalina Sandino Moreno – Maria Full of Grace
 Annette Bening – Being Julia

Best Cinematography (TIE)
Robert Richardson - The Aviator

Christopher Doyle - Ying xiong (Hero)

Best Director
Clint Eastwood - Million Dollar Baby

Best Documentary Feature
Fahrenheit 9/11

Best Film
Sideways

Best Foreign Language Film
Un long dimanche de fiançailles (A Very Long Engagement), France/United StatesBest Original ScoreHoward Shore - The Aviator

Best Screenplay
Sideways - Alexander Payne and Jim TaylorBest Supporting ActorThomas Haden Church - Sideways

Best Supporting Actress
Virginia Madsen - Sideways

Most Promising Filmmaker
Zach Braff - Garden State

Most Promising Performer
Catalina Sandino Moreno - Maria Full of Grace

References
 https://web.archive.org/web/20120515203059/http://www.chicagofilmcritics.org/index.php?option=com_content&view=article&id=48&Itemid=58

 2004
2004 film awards